The Solomon Islands campaign was a major campaign of the Pacific War of World War II. The campaign began with Japanese landings and capture of several areas in the British Solomon Islands and Bougainville, in the Territory of New Guinea, during the first six months of 1942.  The Japanese occupied these locations and began the construction of several naval and air bases with the goals of protecting the flank of the Japanese offensive in New Guinea, establishing a security barrier for the major Japanese base at Rabaul on New Britain, and providing bases for interdicting supply lines between the Allied powers of the United States and Australia and New Zealand.

The Allies, to defend their communication and supply lines in the South Pacific, supported a counteroffensive in New Guinea, isolated the Japanese base at Rabaul, and counterattacked the Japanese in the Solomons with landings on Guadalcanal (see Guadalcanal campaign) and small neighboring islands on 7 August 1942.  These landings initiated a series of combined-arms battles between the two adversaries, beginning with the Guadalcanal landing and continuing with several battles in the central and northern Solomons, on and around New Georgia Island, and Bougainville Island.

In a campaign of attrition fought on land, on sea, and in the air, the Allies wore the Japanese down, inflicting irreplaceable losses on Japanese military assets.  The Allies retook some of the Solomon Islands (although resistance continued until the end of the war), and they also isolated and neutralized some Japanese positions, which were then bypassed.  The Solomon Islands campaign then converged with the New Guinea campaign.

Background

Strategic background
On December 7, 1941, after failing to resolve a dispute with the United States over Japan's actions in China and French Indochina, the Japanese attacked the US Pacific fleet at Pearl Harbor, Hawaii. The surprise attack crippled most of the U.S. Pacific Fleet's battleships and started a war between the two nations. Attacks on British Empire possessions in the Pacific, beginning with an attack on Hong Kong almost simultaneously with the Pearl Harbor attack, brought the United Kingdom, Australia and New Zealand into the conflict.  The Japanese sought to neutralize the U.S. and Royal navies, seize possessions rich in natural resources, and obtain strategic military bases to defend their far-flung empire.  In the words of the Japanese Navy's Combined Fleet Secret Order Number One, dated November 1, 1941, the goals of the initial Japanese campaigns in the impending war were to "[eject] British and American strength from the Netherlands Indies and the Philippines, [and] to establish a policy of autonomous self-sufficiency and economic independence."

The Empire of Japan accomplished its initial strategic objectives in the first six months of the war, capturing Hong Kong, the Philippines, Thailand, Malaya, Singapore, the Dutch East Indies, Wake Island, New Britain, the northern Gilbert Islands, and Guam.  A Japanese goal was to establish an effective defensive perimeter from British India on the west, through the Dutch East Indies on the south, and to island bases in the south and central Pacific as its southeastern line of defense. Anchoring its defensive positions in the South Pacific was the major Japanese army and navy base at Rabaul, New Britain, which had been captured from the Australians in January 1942.  In March and April, Japanese forces occupied and began constructing an airfield at Buka in northern Bougainville, as well as an airfield and naval base at Buin, in southern Bougainville.

Japanese advance into the Solomons
In April 1942, the Japanese Army and Navy together initiated Operation Mo, a joint plan to capture Port Moresby in New Guinea.  Also part of the plan was a Navy operation to capture Tulagi in the southern Solomons.  The objective of the operation was for the Japanese to extend their southern perimeter and to establish bases to support possible future advances to seize Nauru, Ocean Island, New Caledonia, Fiji, and Samoa and thereby cut the supply lines between Australia and the United States, with the goal of reducing or eliminating Australia as a threat to Japanese positions in the South Pacific.  The Japanese Navy also proposed a future invasion of Australia, but the Army answered that it currently lacked enough troops to support such an operation.

Japanese naval forces captured Tulagi but its invasion of Port Moresby was repulsed at the Battle of the Coral Sea.  Shortly thereafter, the Japanese Navy established small garrisons on the other northern and central Solomon Islands.  One month later, the Japanese Combined Fleet lost four of its fleet aircraft carriers at the Battle of Midway.

The Allies countered the threats to Australia by a build-up of troops and aircraft, with the aim of implementing plans to approach and reconquer the Philippines.  In March 1942 Admiral Ernest King, then Commander-in Chief of the U.S. Fleet, had advocated an offense from New Hebrides through the Solomon Islands to the Bismarck Archipelago.  Following the victory at Midway, General Douglas MacArthur, who had taken command of the South West Pacific Area, proposed a lightning offense to retake Rabaul, which the Japanese were fortifying and using as a base of operations. The United States Navy advocated a more gradual approach from New Guinea and up the Solomon Island chain. These competing proposals were resolved by Admiral King and U.S. Army Chief of Staff General George C. Marshall, who adopted a three-task plan.  Task One was the capture of the island of Tulagi in the Solomons.  Task Two was an advance along the New Guinea coast.  Task Three was the capture of Rabaul.  Task One, implemented by a directive of the Joint Chiefs of Staff on 2 July 1942 and named the initial attacks Operation Watchtower, became the Solomon Islands campaign.

Course of campaign
On 7 August 1942 U.S. Marines landed on Guadalcanal, beginning the Guadalcanal Campaign. The Allies created a combined air formation, the Cactus Air Force, establishing air superiority during daylight hours. The Japanese then resorted to nightly resupply missions which they called "Rat Transportation" (and the Allies called "the Tokyo Express") through New Georgia Sound (a.k.a. "The Slot"). Many pitched battles were fought trying to stop Japanese supplies from getting through. So many ships were lost by both sides during the Guadalcanal campaign that the southern end of New Georgia Sound, the area north of Guadalcanal previously called Savo Sound, became known as "Ironbottom Sound".

Allied success in the Solomon Islands campaign prevented the Japanese from cutting Australia and New Zealand off from the United States. Operation Cartwheel — the Allied grand strategy for the Solomons and New Guinea campaigns  — launched on June 30, 1943, isolated and neutralized Rabaul and destroyed much of Japan's sea and air supremacy. This opened the way for Allied forces to recapture the Philippines and cut off Japan from its crucial resource areas in the Netherlands East Indies.

The Solomons campaign culminated in the often bitter fighting of the Bougainville campaign, which continued until the end of the war.

See also

New Guinea campaign
New Britain campaign
Gilbert and Marshall Islands campaign
Guadalcanal Campaign
Operation Vengeance
AirSols
Battle of the Coral Sea

Notes

References

Sources

 on Google Books

External links
 
 (translation of excerpts from the Senshi Sōsho)
 Also available at:  

 WW2DB: Solomons Campaign
- Translation of the official record by the Japanese Demobilization Bureaux detailing the Imperial Japanese Army and Navy's participation in the Southwest Pacific area of the Pacific War.

Further reading

 Hungerford, T. A. G. (1952). The Ridge and the River. Sydney: Angus & Robertson. Republished by Penguin, 1992; .

 
Campaigns of World War II
Solomon Islands 1942-45
Solomon Islands 1942-45
Conflicts in 1942
Conflicts in 1943
Conflicts in 1944
Conflicts in 1945
1942 in the Solomon Islands
1943 in the Solomon Islands
1944 in the Solomon Islands
1945 in the Solomon Islands
Battles and operations of World War II involving the Solomon Islands
Battles and operations of World War II involving Australia
Battles and operations of World War II involving Papua New Guinea
Campaigns, operations and battles of World War II involving the United Kingdom
Wars involving Tonga